Woollahra railway station was a proposed railway station on Sydney's Eastern Suburbs line.  Named after the suburb it was located in, Woollahra railway station would have been built between the present stations of Edgecliff and Bondi Junction.  The proposed site of the station currently exists as a cutting off Edgecliff Road.  Had this station been completed, it would have been the only above-ground station on the line.  Opposition from local residents and costs associated with the construction of the Eastern Suburbs railway prevented the station from being opened.

History
When the Eastern Suburbs Line was under construction in the 1960s and 1970s, the plan was to locate a station in a closed off grass cutting backing onto the backyards of properties on four surrounding streets. It is believed that the cutting had, for many years, been owned and preserved by the then NSW Department of Railways, as a future potential railway site. Local residents, unaware of this, would use the pleasant but enclosed grassy cutting as a hidden local park. The area, being surrounded by the high rocky escarpment that is Edgecliff Road, Woollahra, contained many trees and was a sanctuary for bird life.

The local residents, appalled to learn in the 1960s that the cutting would become a heavy railway station – to boot, the only above ground station on the line – lobbied the Government of New South Wales vigorously to oppose the station. In the meantime, construction work on the Eastern Suburbs line was slowing down due to various factors including the cost blow-outs of the project. With the Edgecliff railway station buildings and tunnels built by 1969, and the line all the way to Bondi Junction railway station not opening until 1979, this gave the residents of Woollahra plenty of time to organise their opposition to the station.

Notwithstanding the fact that, at the time, the station may have had low patronage, the local community took the NSW Government all the way to the High Court of Australia to oppose the opening of the station, an action that was lost. Despite construction work taking place, and the basic station infrastructure being constructed, community angst as well as the cost factors surrounding the project, eventually led the Government to abandon the idea of placing a functioning station there. Furthermore, the Government and Railways Department, then RailCorp taking into account the fact that the rail lines are within around five metres of suburban backyards, then went as far as to install silencing structures around the tracks. These concrete and steel silencers in fact created what is the quietest section of railway track in Australia, with trains gliding on by  day and night, emitting only an eerie low hum as they pass through the cutting.

Abandoned station infrastructure

The station itself consists of a central eight-car length platform, which in fact is only the concrete foundations of full passenger platforms. Only at one end of the 'station', where electricity substations are housed, does the central platform resemble the other operational stations on the line. The tracks emerge at the 'Edgecliff end' of the abandoned station from a high sandstone wall, indicating that the former unused grassy area was half cut out of the natural topography. At the Bondi Junction end the tracks emerge from beneath a grassy hill sloping somewhat steeply down from an adjacent street. The tunnels at this point are clearly not far beneath the road and residential properties, as they curve to the south-east. The tracks themselves have a slight south-easterly curve.

The abandoned station is surrounded on one side by a row of backyard fences. While this is a common sight in Sydney's working class inner-west and inner-south, it is interesting to see the backyards of multimillion-dollar properties backing onto a heavy rail line just metres away. On the other side, the station is bordered by a large empty park-like area.

On this side, a long, steep, narrow block of vacant land exists, rising all the way up to Edgecliff Road. This is between two private properties, and is not accessible to the public. Records from the old Department of Railways would indicate that this was intended to be the location of an elevator to the grassy park-like area, which would have been completely landscaped, and was intended to house the ticketing office, entry barriers to the station, one or two small retail outlets, and an overhead bridge and staircase down to the platforms. The platforms themselves would have been covered over with shelter, but it was not intended that they would be completely enclosed. Other entry points to the station would have been via escalator from the Edgecliff end, from Edgecliff Road, and from Wallaroy Road at the Bondi Junction end.

Station visibility
It is not known if the Department planned to resume any of the properties directly next to the tracks for further infrastructure works. The abandoned station is fully visible from a small grassy look-out off Edgecliff Road. The view from this look-out is extremely pleasant: the viewer can see the station and trains passing underneath, but the mini-CBD skyline of Bondi Junction to the south-east is fully visible in the distance; ironically, the line's terminus building is also visible from this point. The station is also semi-visible from Wallaroy Road at the Bondi Junction end of the tracks.

External links
NSWRail.net - Images and information about Woollahra Station
 - SMH news article on Woollahra railway station

Disused railway stations in Sydney
Eastern Suburbs railway line
Woollahra, New South Wales